Robert Joseph Guerrero (born March 27, 1983) is an American professional boxer. He has held world championships in two weight classes, including the IBF featherweight title twice between 2006 and 2008, and the IBF junior lightweight title from 2009 to 2010. Additionally he has held multiple interim titles at lightweight and welterweight.

Professional career

Featherweight

Early career 
Guerrero is trained by his father Ruben Guerrero, a former amateur champion, who introduced Robert and his five brothers to boxing as youngsters growing up in Gilroy, California. After an impressive amateur career begun at a very young age, Robert turned professional, at the age of 18, on May 22, 2001 with a four-round unanimous decision win against Alejandro Cruz. After several wins and only a single draw later, Guerrero won the WBC NABF Featherweight title against Cesar Figueroa on December 9, 2004. Defending his NABF title twice, Guerrero was seen as a rising prospect, until meeting Gamaliel Diaz in a bout televised on ShoBox, on the Showtime channel, on December 12, 2005. An aggressive Diaz upset Guerrero, winning by split decision and taking the NABF belt in the process.

Guerrero rebounded from his first loss by defeating Sandros Marcos via third-round technical knock-out, setting up a rematch against Diaz, again on Showtime. Guerrero knocked down Diaz in the first round, and eventually knocking out Diaz early in the sixth round. The win set him up to face IBF champion Eric Aiken.

Featherweight title
In his first world championship fight on September 2, 2006, Guerrero defeated Eric Aiken by an eighth-round technical knockout in Los Angeles. Guerrero used inside fighting, neutralizing Aiken's power, and eventually making Aiken quit on his stool after the eighth round to earn his first world title belt.

Guerrero vs. Salido
Guerrero lost the belt in his next fight in a mandatory defense to Orlando Salido in Las Vegas. Salido dominated the majority of the bout and pulled off an upset decision win with scores of 115–113, 117–111, 118–110. However, Salido would subsequently be stripped of the IBF title after testing positive for steroids, thus vacating the belt; the result of the bout would also be changed to a twelve-round no decision by the Nevada State Athletic Commission.

The IBF subsequently gave Guerrero the shot at the vacant featherweight title, which he won by ninth-round technical knockout in Copenhagen, Denmark on February 23, 2007, against Albanian boxer Spend Abazi.

Guerrero's second defense of his second title was to be against Rocky Juarez (27–3, 19 KOs); however, Juarez chose to meet WBC Super Featherweight Champion Juan Manuel Márquez in a money fight instead.  Guerrero's first defense was scheduled to be against Martin Honorio (24–3–1) on November 3, 2007, and was televised on Showtime, on the undercard of the Marquez-Juarez match. Guerrero was unable to attend the final press conference before the match after his wife Casey was diagnosed with leukemia. Guerrero defeated Honorio in a first round knock-out.

On February 29, 2008, Guerrero defeated Jason Litzau via an eighth round knock out. Guerrero then vacated the title to move up in weight.

Super featherweight

Guerrero vs. Yordan
On March 7, 2009, Guerrero fought Daud Yordan in his HBO debut. The fight ended in a second round "no contest" decision after Guerrero suffered a headbutt resulting in a gash above his eye. After the bout Guerrero offered Yordan a rematch, however, Yordan reportedly declined.

Guerrero vs. Hinojosa 
On June 12, 2009, Guerrero faced Efren Hinojosa (30–5–1). He suffered another deep cut near his left eye from a head-butt in the seventh round, but this time it did not slow his progress as he scored an eighth round TKO victory. After the bout, the media described him as having redeemed himself for his previous lackluster effort.

Guerrero vs. Klassen 
On August 22, 2009, Guerrero challenged Malcolm Klassen for his IBF Super Featherweight title. Guerrero won the fight by a unanimous decision to claim the world title. The scores were 117–112, 116–112 and 115–113 in his favor.

In February 2010, Guerrero vacated his Featherweight title in order to care for his ailing wife.

Lightweight

Guererro vs. Arrieta 
On April 30, 2010, Guerrero moved up to the lightweight division to fight Robert Arrieta (35–15–4). The bout took place at the Tropicana Hotel and Casino in Las Vegas, Nevada, United States. Guerrero won the fight by TKO in the 8th round.

After the bout, Guerrero expressed his interest in fighting Mexican champion Juan Manuel Márquez.

Light welterweight

Guerrero vs. Casamayor
On July 31, 2010, Guerrero moved up to the junior welterweight division and faced Cuban fighter Joel Casamayor on the undercard of the Marquez vs. Diaz pay-per-view at the Mandalay Bay in Las Vegas. Guerrero defeated Casamayor by a 10-round unanimous decision.

Return to lightweight

Guerrero vs. Escobedo 
On November 6, 2010, he faced Vicente Escobedo for the vacant WBO Inter-Continental lightweight title. Guerrero knocked Escobedo down in the third and sixth rounds en route to a ten-round unanimous decision.

Guerrero vs. Katsidis 
On April 9, 2011, Guerrero faced Michael Katsidis for the interim WBA and WBO lightweight titles. Guerrero won the bout with a 12-round unanimous decision. In a post-fight interview when asked about his hometown he said, "It's nice when you're pretty much their biggest thing besides garlic in Gilroy." Guerrero was scheduled to face Marcos Maidana in August for the WBA junior welterweight title, however, he was forced to pull out of the bout after suffering a torn tendon in his rotator cuff. He underwent surgery to repair the injury and was out of the ring for 6 months.

Welterweight

Guerrero vs. Aydin 
Guerrero returned to the ring by jumping two weight classes to face unbeaten top 10 welterweight Selcuk Aydin. On July 28, 2012 Guerrero defeated Aydin in San Jose, California by unanimous decision for the interim WBC welterweight title.

Guerrero vs. Berto
Guerrero's next fight was against former two-time Welterweight champion Andre Berto (28–1, 22 KO) at the Citizens Bank Business Arena in Ontario, California. Guerrero started off the fight fast, sending Berto to the canvas each of the first two rounds, as well as badly closing Berto's right eye early on. Berto got back into the fight during the middle rounds, landing hard uppercuts and right hands on Guerrero, who took the punches well. Throughout the fight the two traded punches with Berto on the ropes and Guerrero smothering him, while out working him the majority of the time. By the end of the fight, both of Berto's eyes and Guerrero's right eye were closed shut. Guerrero won a unanimous decision by the scores of 116–110 on all three scorecards. Guerrero had a purse of $1 million, while Berto's purse was $1.625 million. In the post fight interview, Guerrero called out pound-for-pound champion Floyd Mayweather saying, "Pretty Boy, let's do it."

Guerrero vs. Mayweather

On May 4, 2013 in a fight billed as May Day', Guerrero lost to Floyd Mayweather Jr. (43–0, 26 KOs) in the WBC Welterweight Championship fight by a unanimous decision in front of a 15,880 crowd at the MGM Grand arena, with all judges scoring the fight 117–111 in favor of Mayweather. Guerrero won the first 3 rounds, then Mayweather adjusted back to his defensive style and won from the 4th to 12th round. Mayweather landing a high 60 percent of his power punches, which included 23 of 30 power punches in the eighth round, when Guerrero was cut over his left eye. Throughout the fight, Mayweather landed 195 punches to 113 for Guerrero. Guerrero reportedly earned a career high of $3 million and the fight exceeded 1 million ppv buys.

Guerrero vs. Kamegai
Guerrero took off a full year before returning to the ring on June 21, 2014 to fight Japanese boxer Yoshihiro Kamegai. Guererro could hardly open his left eye toward the end of the fight, but scored a unanimous 12-round decision over the tough Kamegai with official scores of 116–112, 117–111, and 117–111, thereby marking a triumphant return to the ring.

Guerrero vs. Thurman
On March 7, Guerrero fought in NBC's first episode of their new series, "Premier Boxing Champions" at the MGM Grand in Las Vegas. Guerrero's opponent was undefeated Keith Thurman. Thurman started off the match as the aggressor, throwing many powerful punches. Guerrero was able to withstand Thurman's blows until he was knocked down in the ninth round. Although the fight seemed bleak for Guerrero he was able to fight back, giving an exciting final three rounds in which he became the aggressor and forced Thurman against the ropes. Ultimately, "The Ghost"  lost by unanimous decision but Guerrero's determination and strong will to win had the crowd of the MGM Grand chanting his name for the majority of the final round.

Guerrero vs. Martinez
On June 6, 2015  Guerrero fought again on NBC as part of the "Premier Boxing Champions" series at StubHub Center, California, against the gritty Aron Martinez (19–4–1, 4 KOs). Martinez proved himself to be an underdog with bite. The action got going in earnest in Round 2, with both fighters working the body hard in some grueling infighting. Martinez continued to press the action in Round 4, scoring a knockdown at the end with hard body shots and then combinations to the head. But the momentum of the fight began to swing back in Guerrero's direction in Round 6, when he fought more from the outside. Both fighters had their moments in the latter half of the fight, but it was Guerrero who was able to control the distance, outland Martinez and pull out a split-decision win in a feisty back-and-forth battle.

Guerrero vs. Garcia
On January 23, 2016 Guerrero fought on FOX as part of the "Premier Boxing Champions" series at Staples Center, California, against the undefeated Danny Garcia (31–0–0, 18 KO) for the vacant WBC Welterweight Championship. The match was ruled a unanimous decision in favor of Garcia with all three judges scoring the bout 116–112, despite fighting on near-equal terms. Guerrero started off impressive, but became less effective late in the fight falling to a 3rd career defeat in a welterweight title fight. Garcia landed 163 of 496 thrown (33%), whilst Guerrero landed 108 of 436 punches thrown (25%).

Guerrero vs. Peralta 
Guerrero's next fight was announced on July 16, to take place at the Honda Center in Anaheim against Argentine boxer David Emanuel Peralta (25–2–1, 14 KOs) on August 27. Guerrero was outboxed, outclassed and beaten by Peralta. The judges decided after 12 rounds Peralta won by split decision, handing Guerrero his 4th loss in his last six fights.

Guerrero vs. Figueroa Jr. 
On May 23, 2017 it was announced that Guerrero would fight at the renovated Nassau Coliseum in Uniondale, New York against undefeated former WBC lightweight champion Omar Figueroa Jr. (26–0–1, 18 KOs) on July 15, 2017. The bout will take place as part of a triple header main event which would include Sean Monaghan vs. Marcus Browne. Before this fight, Figueroa last fought in December 2015. The first boxing event to take place at the Coliseum in 31 years saw Guerrero stopped in the third round in front of a crowd of 7,492. Figueroa dropped Guerrero a total five times before the fight was halted. According to Compubox stats, Figueroa landed 88 of his 185 punches thrown (48%), whilst Guerrero landed 78 of 201 thrown (39%). Guerrero saw success in round 1, but the fight turned around when Figueroa landed a huge left hook knocking Guerrero down and eventually handing him his third consecutive loss. According to Nielsen Media, the fight peaked at 1,039,000 viewers on Fox. The whole show averaged 886,000 viewers.

Retirement 
A couple of days following his first stoppage loss, Guerrero announced his retirement from professional boxing after 16 years. Guerrero had been on a decline, since losing to Floyd Mayweather in 2013. He had only won two of his last six fights. Guerrero said in a statement, 

In the statement, he also thanked advisor Al Haymon and praised him as "the most special man" he ever met in his boxing career. He ended his career with 33 wins out of 42 fights, including 18 wins coming inside the distance.

Comeback

Guerrero vs. Mate 
On November 8, 2018 Guerrero surprisingly announced he would be returning to the boxing ring, stating he had 'some fight left' and also wanting to further his legacy. According to ESPN, his return bout would take place on December 1 on the Wilder vs. Fury Showtime PPV card at the Staples Center in Los Angeles, California. Guerrero was scheduled to fight 27-year-old Hungarian boxer Adam Mate (28–12, 21 KOs) in a 10-round welterweight bout. For the comeback, Guerrero was guaranteed a $25,000 purse. Fighting for the first time in 16 months, Guerrero knocked out Mate in round 2 of their scheduled 8 round bout. Mate was knocked down once in round 1, taking a knee and twice in round 2. After beating the count for the second knockdown, referee Ray Corona stopped the fight. It was Guerrero's first stoppage win in 13 fights, dating back to April 2010.

Guerrero vs. Herrera 
In his next fight, Guerrero defeated Hevinson Herera via a fifth round technical knockout.

Guerrero vs. Thomas 
In his following fight, Guerrero fought Gerald Thomas. Guerrero won the fight via unanimous decision, scoring 99-91, 99-91 and 98-92 on the scorecards.

Guerrero vs. Ortiz 
On August 21, 2021, Guerrero faced former world champion Victor Ortiz. In a fight that lacked action at times, all three judges uniformly saw Guerrero as the narrow winner, with all of them scoring it 96-94 in favor of Guerrero.

Professional boxing record

Pay-per-view bouts

Filmography

References

External links

Robert Guerrero profile at Premier Boxing Champions
Robert Guerrero - Profile, News Archive & Current Rankings at Box.Live

1983 births
Living people
American boxers of Mexican descent
Boxers from California
People from Gilroy, California
Southpaw boxers
Lightweight boxers
Welterweight boxers
International Boxing Federation champions
American male boxers
World featherweight boxing champions
World super-featherweight boxing champions
Gilroy High School alumni